George Ashby (name uncertain) (died 1537) was an English Cistercian monk of Jervaulx Abbey. 

A monk of this name, or Astleby (perhaps a surname taken from a location) is mentioned in various English martyrologies, as a victim of government reprisals after the Pilgrimage of Grace.

References

1537 deaths
English Cistercians
People executed under Henry VIII
Executed English people
Year of birth missing
16th-century English Roman Catholic priests